Mengo Hospital, also known as Namirembe Hospital, is a private, faith-based, community, teaching hospital in Kampala, the capital and largest city of Uganda.

Location

The coordinates of Mengo Hospital are 0°18'46.0"N, 32°33'30.0"E (Latitude:0.312778; Longitude:32.558333).

Overview
Mengo Hospital is the oldest hospital in Uganda. It was established by Albert Ruskin Cook in 1897. At the beginning, the hospital belonged to the Church Missionary Society. During this time, the hospital saw many medical missionaries, including Algernon Smith and Leonard Sharp, who aided in medical care and its expansion. During World War I, the African Medical Corps helped staff the hospital. In 1958, the hospital was handed over by the Church Missionary Society to an independent and autonomous Board of Governors and Registered Trustees.

Today, the hospital is an urban community hospital with all the amenities of a modern hospital in sub-Saharan Africa. It houses the Ernest Cook Radiology Department, named after Ernest Cook, the nephew of Albert Cook, who brought the first X-Ray machine to East Africa in 1907 and installed it at Mengo Hospital. The X-Ray department is located within the Sr. Albert Cook Building. The Department houses the Ernest Cook Ultrasound Research and Education Institute (ECUREI). ECUREI offers ordinary and advanced diploma courses in ultrasonography and degrees in medical imaging. The institute is affiliated with Thomas Jefferson University in Philadelphia, Pennsylvania, United States. It is also collaborates with Fontys University in the Netherlands in its training programs.

Medical school
In March 2016, the Daily Monitor newspaper reported that Mengo Hospital was negotiating with Uganda Christian University, in Mukono to establish a medical school at the hospital. No time-frame was disclosed.

See also
Kampala Capital City Authority
Mengo Palace
Hospitals in Uganda
Church of Uganda

References

External links

 Mengo Hospital Homepage

Hospitals in Kampala
Lubaga Division
Hospitals established in 1897
1897 establishments in Uganda
Teaching hospitals in Uganda